Guillermo García López was the defending champion but chose not to defend his title.

Félix Auger-Aliassime won the title after defeating Kamil Majchrzak 6–3, 6–2 in the final.

Seeds

Draw

Finals

Top half

Bottom half

References
Main Draw
Qualifying Draw

2018 ATP Challenger Tour
2018 Singles